Calico is a plain-woven cotton textile.

It may also refer to:

Textiles
Calico (American English), the same as chintz

Plants and animals

Animals
Calico (goldfish), goldfish that have a type of metallic and transparent scales
Calico butterfly, a genus of brush-footed butterflies commonly called the crackers, calicoes, or clicks
Calico cat, a domestic cat, almost always female, with the common three- or four-colored coat pattern calico
Calico grouper, a species of fish found in Bermuda and the United States

Plants
Alternanthera bettzickiana, also known as calico plant
Aristolochia littoralis, a species of vine also called calico flower
 Flint corn, also called calico corn
Kalmia latifolia, a species of flowering plant also known as calico-bush
Loeseliastrum, a genus of flower plants also called calico

Places
Calico, California, a ghost town
Calico, North Carolina, an unincorporated community
Calico, West Virginia, an unincorporated community
Calico Bay, a bay in North Carolina
Calico Hills, Humboldt County, Nevada
Calico Mountains (California), a mountain range in the Mojave Desert
Calico Early Man Site, a possible archaeological site in the mountain range
Calico Peaks, mountains within the Calico mountain range
Calico National Recreation Trail, Colorado
Calico Valley, a valley in Georgia

People
Tara Calico (born 1969), an American woman who disappeared in 1988
Tyrone Calico (born 1980), an American football wide receiver
 Calico Cooper (born 1981), an American actress and daughter of the rock and roll musician Alice Cooper
Calico Jack (1682–1720), an English pirate captain in the early 18th century
 Calico (footballer) (born 1987), Portuguese footballer

Arts and entertainment

 "Calico", a song from the album Anthology by Alien Ant Farm
 "Calico", the 4th song on the 1993 album So Tough, performed and written by indie dance band Saint Etienne
 Calico, a fictional research vessel in the 1978-1981 TV series Godzilla
 Dr Calico, a fictional character in the movie Bolt (2008), voiced by Malcolm McDowell
 Calico, a 2020 board game

Companies and organizations
Calico (company), department of Alphabet responsible for health, life sciences and biotechnology 

CALICO (consortium), an international consortium for information on language learning technology
Calico Light Weapons Systems, a small firearms manufacturing company currently based in Hillsboro, Oregon
Calico Mills, one of Ahmedabad's (India) earliest textile mills

Other uses
Calico Solar Energy Project, a proposed California solar energy plant

See also 
Iowa Central Air Line Railroad, a 19th-century railroad known derisively as the "Calico railroad"